Pasko Naming Hangad is the third album recorded by Philippine-based vocal ensemble Hangad. It is Hangad's first Christmas-themed album, containing original compositions and arrangements of some familiar Christmas songs.

Pasko Naming Hangad was launched on December 6, 2002, at the Church of the Gesu, Ateneo de Manila University, Quezon City.

Track listing 
English translation of Tagalog titles are provided in parentheses. Note: these translations are not official.
 Alleluia
 Music by Paulo K. Tirol; percussion arrangement by James Bitanga
 Sanggol Sa Sabsaban (Child in the manger)
 Words and music by Vincent de Jesus
 O Come All Ye Faithful
 Traditional; arranged by P. Tirol
 Simeon's Canticle
 Setting by M. Francisco, SJ (based on Luke 2:29-32); Additional text and arrangement by P. Tirol
 Walang Iba Kundi Pag-Ibig
 (Tag. Nothing else but love)– Words and music by V. de Jesus
 Guest performer: Noel Cabangon (soloist)
 Oyayi (Lullabye)
 Words and music by Arnel Aquino, SJ
 The Day The Child Was Born
 Words and music by James Bitanga
 Silent Night
 Lyrics by Franz Gruber; Music by Franz Gruber; arranged by P. Tirol
 Where You Are
 Words by Julius Guevarra and Mark Lopez; music by J. Guevarra; additional string arrangement by J. Guevarra and Jay Gomez
 Kahit Na Abril Ay Parang Pasko Pa Rin (Tag. It's Christmas in April, Too)
 Words and music by V. de Jesus
 Bisperas (Tag. Christmas Eve)
 Words and music by A. Aquino, SJ; arrangement by JC Uy
 O Holy Night
 Original words and music by Adolphe Adam; arranged by JC Uy
 Praise Alleluia
 Words and music by J. Bitanga
 Peace Prayer
 Original words and music by David Haas (based on a Navajo prayer, with parts adapted from Jesu, Joy of Man's Desiring by J. S. Bach, and Greensleeves/What Child Is This?); arrangement by P. Tirol
 Umaga Sa Pasko (instrumental) (Christmas Morning)
 Music by P. Tirol; arrangement by JC Uy

Simeon's Canticle Music Video 

Hangad released the music video for Simeon's Canticle, featuring vignettes of people who have provided community service (for example, former Philippine Health undersecretary Jaime Galvez Tan, M.D.). The video, as in other Hangad music videos, feature Hangad itself near the end.

Although Simeon's Canticle was originally released at the Hangad debut album's CD version, the music video was produced only after Pasko Naming Hangad was published. It was shown on major television stations and still enjoys regular broadcasts on RPN (now known as CNN Philippines) and IBC.

Credits 
 Instrumentalists
 Guest singer - Noel Cabangon
 Cello - Nino Llorin
 Violins - Jeremy Dadap (track 9)

Production
 Executive Producer - Ari Dy, SJ
 Produced by Hangad, the Jesuit Music Ministry and the Jesuit Communications Foundation, Inc.
 Production team - Mariel de Jesus, Atoy Salazar and JC Uy
 Inlay design and illustration, album art direction - Kyle Baizas and Lance Lazatin

Engineering
 Mixing and Mastering Engineer - Ditoy Aguila
 Recording Engineer - Willan Caimol and Toto Sorioso
 Recorded and mixed at SFX Digital Sound Studio

Songbook
For Pasko Naming Hangad: Vocal Arrangements (2003)
 Production Manager - TJ San Jose
 Score design and layout - Monchu Lucero (Luxis Graphikos)
 Editors - Cha Lagrisola, Monchu Lucero, Clare Royandoyan, TJ San Jose, JC Uy
 Encoders - James Bitanga, Julius Guevarra, Monchu Lucero, Atoy Salazar, Paulo Tirol
 Copy editors - Trin Panganiban-Custodio, Paulo Tirol, JC Uy
 Additional text - Arnel Aquino, SJ;
 Book Design - Monchu Lccero (Luxis Graphikos)
 Front cover and illustrations - Kyle Baizas, Lance Lazatin

Accolades 
Pasko Naming Hangad was nominated for Best Album Packaging of the Year at the Awit Awards

External links 
 Pasko Naming Hangad – information about the album, including audio samples and lyrics.

Hangad albums
2002 Christmas albums
Christmas albums by Filipino artists